The Fall of the House of Usher is a 1928 French horror film directed by Jean Epstein, one of several films based on the 1839 Gothic short story The Fall of the House of Usher by Edgar Allan Poe.

Plot
Roderick Usher summons his friend to his crumbling old mansion in the remote countryside. Usher has been obsessed with painting a portrait of his dying wife Madeline. When she passes away, Usher has her buried in the family crypt, but the audience soon discovers that Madeline wasn't really dead, that she was buried alive in the tomb. Madeline revives from her catalepsy, exits her coffin and returns to her shocked husband.

Cast
 Jean Debucourt as Roderick Usher
 Marguerite Gance as Madeline Usher
 Abel Gance
 Charles Lamy as the guest invited to the mansion
 Fournez-Goffard
 Luc Dartagnan

Production
The Fall in the House of Usher was written by Luis Buñuel and Jean Epstein. The film was Buñuel's second film credit, he having previously worked as an assistant director on Epstein's film Mauprat.  Following an argument with Epstein about his interpretation of the material, Buñuel left the production. Among the changes in the story from the original material was the relationship between Roderick and his sister which was changed to man and wife in the film. Film critic and historian Troy Howarth stated it was unclear how much if anything of Buñuel's writing was included in the finished film.

The film co-starred French film director Abel Gance and his then-wife Marguerite Gance, fresh from their collaboration on Gance's epic 1927 film Napoleon.

Release
The film was released on 28 October 1928.

The Poe story was released again in 1928 directed by James Sibley Watson, in 1950 by Ivan Barnett, and in 1960 by Roger Corman.

Reception
From retrospective reviews, critic Troy Howarth commented that the film was "one of the most renowned of experimental silent films" noting "The rapid cutting, fetishistic closeups and generally dreamy ambience bring the movie closer to the realm of filmic poetry than anything else". Howarth concluded that the film was Epstein's "most enduring contribution to cinema".

American critic Roger Ebert included the film on his list of "Great Movies". In 2021, The Daily Star ranked The Fall of the House of Usher 8th on its list of the greatest short story adaptations, praising it for "manag[ing] the almost impossible feat of the perfect Edgar Allan Poe adaption".

It was listed by Paste magazine in 2021 as one of the "13 Best Edgar Allan Poe Adaptations".

The Japanese filmmaker Akira Kurosawa cited this movie as one of his 100 favorite films.

See also
 The Fall of the House of Usher (1928 American film)

Footnotes

Sources

External links
 
 

1928 films
1928 horror films
Films based on The Fall of the House of Usher
Films directed by Jean Epstein
French black-and-white films
French horror films
French silent feature films
Silent horror films
1920s French films